The 37th National Hockey League All-Star Game was held in the Olympic Saddledome in Calgary, home of the Calgary Flames, on February 12, 1985.  The Wales Conference defeated the Campbell Conference 6–4.  The game's most valuable player was Mario Lemieux, who became the first rookie to win All-Star MVP honours, a feat that would not be repeated until 33 years later by Vancouver Canuck Brock Boeser in 2018.

Host city
The 37th All-Star Game marked the first time the event was held in Calgary.  The game was held in the two-year-old Olympic Saddledome, which had been built following the Flames arrival in Calgary, and in anticipation of the 1988 Winter Olympics.  A sell-out crowd of 16,825 attended the game, and the gala also sold out.  In total, $100,000 was raised by the Flames which was donated to charity. The traditional black-tie nature of the banquet and gala were eschewed for this game as the hosts asked attendees to dress up in western wear.

Campbell Conference and Edmonton Oilers head coach Glen Sather expressed displeasure that the fans in Calgary did not let go of the Battle of Alberta for the game.  He took issue with the fans booing Edmonton's Wayne Gretzky during the player introductions and the game itself.  "It's embarrassing when they boo Wayne when he touches the puck.  They booed him once before when he was hurt so..."  For his part, Gretzky downplayed Sather's concerns:  "I've certainly got nothing against them booing me.  I kind of get a kick out of it."

To help raise awareness for 1983–85 famine in Ethiopia, the NHL All-Stars participated in the Canadian entertainment's response to the crisis.  The players, along with music producer David Foster, shot a video segment for the Northern Lights' song Tears Are Not Enough.

Highlights
For the first time, the NHL named honorary captains for each team.  Hockey Hall of Fame goaltender Glenn Hall was named the honorary captain of the Campbell Conference, while Guy Lafleur, who had retired only three months previous, represented the Wales Conference.  Lafleur returned to the game four years later, and thus became the only person to play in the NHL after serving as an honorary All-Star captain.  The ceremonial faceoff was performed by Canadian astronaut Marc Garneau and used a puck that he had taken into outer space.

Mario Lemieux entered the game facing criticism from former NHL coach, and Canadian Broadcasting Corporation commentator, Don Cherry who stated that Lemieux was a "floater" in reference to Lemieux's lack of defensive play during the season.  The 19-year-old rookie dismissed Cherry's arguments, stating that "the Penguins asked me to play offensively, not to care about my defensive play."  Lemieux recorded two goals, including the game winner, and added an assist to earn honours as the game's most valuable player.  Lemieux is the first player in All-Star Game history to win the award in his rookie year (33 years later, Brock Boeser would become the second rookie to be named All-Star Game MVP).

Edmonton's Mike Krushelnyski and Boston's Ray Bourque were named the second and third stars of the game.  Bourque led all players offensively by recording four assists for the Wales Conference while Krushelnyski led the Campbell Conference with three assists.  Neither of the Flames representatives scored. The game featured an increased European flavour when compared to previous All-Star Games.  Five European players participated.  Swedes Anders Hedberg and Pelle Lindbergh played for the Wales Conference.  Swede Thomas Gradin, Czech Miroslav Frycer and Finn Jari Kurri represented the Campbell Conference.  Hedberg and Frycer each scored a goal for their respective conferences.

Team Lineups

Game summary

Referee: Andy Van Hellemond
Linesmen: Gerard Gauthier, Bob Hodges
TV: CBC, SRC, USA Network

See also 
 1984–85 NHL season

References
 
Rosters: 
Box score: 

All
Calgary Flames
Ice hockey competitions in Calgary
National Hockey League All-Star Games
National Hockey League All-Star Game
National Hockey League All-Star Game